Gastrolobium is a genus of flowering plants in the family Fabaceae. There are over 100 species in this genus, and all but two are native to the south west region of Western Australia.

A significant number of the species accumulate monofluoroacetate (the key ingredient of the poison known commonly as 1080), which caused introduced/non native animal deaths from the 1840s in Western Australia. The controversy over the cause of the stock poisoning in that time involved the botanist James Drummond in a series of tests to ascertain the cause of the poisoning, which was determined to be caused primarily by the plants York Road poison (G. calycinum) and Champion Bay poison (G. oxylobioides).

In the 1930s and 1940s C.A. Gardner and H.W. Bennetts identified other species in Western Australia, leading to the publication of The Toxic Plants of Western Australia in 1956.

The base chromosome number of Gastrolobium is 2n = 16.

Species
Gastrolobium comprises the following species:

Gastrolobium bilobum Group
 Gastrolobium acrocaroli G. Chandler & Crisp
 Gastrolobium bilobum R.Br.—Heart-leaved poison
 Gastrolobium brevipes Crisp
 Gastrolobium callistachys Meisn.—Rock poison
 Gastrolobium congestum G. Chandler & Crisp

 Gastrolobium cuneatum Henfry—River poison

 Gastrolobium grandiflorum F.Muell.—Wallflower poison
 Gastrolobium graniticum (S.Moore) Crisp—Granite poison
 Gastrolobium involutum G. Chandler & Crisp

 Gastrolobium semiteres G. Chandler & Crisp
 Gastrolobium stenophyllum Turcz.—Phillips River poison, Narrow-leaved poison
 Gastrolobium tergiversum G. Chandler & Crisp

Gastrolobium parviflorum Subgroup
 Gastrolobium discolor G. Chandler, Crisp & R.J. Bayer
 Gastrolobium melanocarpum G. Chandler & Crisp
 Gastrolobium musaceum G. Chandler & Crisp
 Gastrolobium parviflorum (Benth.) Crisp—Box poison
 Gastrolobium tetragonophyllum (E.Pritz.) Crisp—Brother-brother

Gastrolobium calycinum Group
 Gastrolobium appressum C.A.Gardner—Scaleleaf poison
 Gastrolobium calycinum Benth.—York Road poison

 Gastrolobium hamulosum Meisn.—Hook Point poison
 Gastrolobium oxylobioides Benth.—Champion Bay poison
 Gastrolobium racemosum (Turcz.) Crisp—Net-leaved poison
 Gastrolobium reflexum G. Chandler & Crisp
 Gastrolobium rigidum (C.A.Gardner) Crisp—Rigid leaf poison

 Gastrolobium spectabile (Endl.) Crisp—Roe's poison
 Gastrolobium tenue G. Chandler & Crisp

Gastrolobium celsianum Group
 Gastrolobium bracteolosum (F. Muell.) G. Chandler & Crisp
 Gastrolobium celsianum (Lem.) G. Chandler & Crisp—Swan River pea
 Gastrolobium formosum (Kippist ex Lindl.) G. Chandler & Crisp
 Gastrolobium leakeanum Drumm.—Mountain pea
 Gastrolobium luteifolium (Domin) G. Chandler & Crisp
 Gastrolobium melanopetalum (F. Muell.) G. Chandler & Crisp
 Gastrolobium minus (Crisp) G. Chandler & Crisp
 Gastrolobium modestum (Crisp) G. Chandler & Crisp
 Gastrolobium mondurup G. Chandler & Crisp
 Gastrolobium papilio (Crisp) G. Chandler & Crisp
 Gastrolobium praemorsum (Meisn.) G. Chandler & Crisp
 Gastrolobium rubrum (Crisp) G. Chandler & Crisp
 Gastrolobium sericeum (Sm.) G. Chandler & Crisp
 Gastrolobium subcordatum (Benth.) G. Chandler & Crisp
 Gastrolobium vestitum (Domin) G. Chandler & Crisp

Gastrolobium cruciatum Group
 Gastrolobium cruciatum G. Chandler & Crisp
 Gastrolobium epacridoides Meisn.
 Gastrolobium punctatum (Turcz.) G. Chandler & Crisp
 Gastrolobium reticulatum (Meisn.) Benth.

Gastrolobium floribundum Group

 Gastrolobium crassifolium Benth.—Thick-leaved poison
 Gastrolobium diabolophyllum G. Chandler, Crisp & R.J. Bayer
 Gastrolobium floribundum S.Moore—Wodjil poison
 Gastrolobium glaucum C.A.Gardner—Spike poison
 Gastrolobium hians G.Chandler & Crisp

 Gastrolobium laytonii Jean White—Breelya, Kite-leaved poison
 Gastrolobium microcarpum (Meisn.) Benth.—Sandplain poison
 Gastrolobium parvifolium Benth.—Berry poison
 Gastrolobium polystachyum Meisn.—Horned poison, Hill River poison
 Gastrolobium propinquum C.A.Gardner—Hutt River poison
 Gastrolobium pycnostachyum Benth.—Mount Ragged poison, Round-leaved poison
 Gastrolobium velutinum Lindl. & Paxton—White gum poison, Stirling Range poison

Gastrolobium heterophyllum Group
 Gastrolobium heterophyllum (Turcz.) Crisp—Slender poison
 Gastrolobium nutans G. Chandler & Crisp
 Gastrolobium pusillum Crisp & P.H. Weston

Gastrolobium ilicifolium Group
 Gastrolobium ilicifolium Meisn.
 Gastrolobium rhombifolium G. Chandler & Crisp
 Gastrolobium tricuspidatum Meisn.

Gastrolobium obovatum Group
 Gastrolobium bennettsianum C.A.Gardner—Cluster poison
 Gastrolobium brownii Meisn.
 Gastrolobium hookeri Meisn.
 Gastrolobium latifolium (R. Br.) G. Chandler & Crisp
 Gastrolobium obovatum Benth.

 Gastrolobium plicatum Turcz.
 Gastrolobium pulchellum Turcz.
 Gastrolobium spathulatum Benth.
 Gastrolobium stowardii S. Moore
 Gastrolobium truncatum Benth.

Gastrolobium pyramidale Group
 Gastrolobium coriaceum (Sm.) G. Chandler & Crisp
 Gastrolobium crenulatum Turcz.
 Gastrolobium pyramidale T.Moore

Gastrolobium retusum Group
 Gastrolobium acutum Benth.
 Gastrolobium alternifolium G. Chandler & Crisp
 Gastrolobium capitatum (Benth.) G. Chandler & Crisp
 Gastrolobium crispatum G. Chandler & Crisp
 Gastrolobium dorrienii (Domin) G. Chandler & Crisp
 Gastrolobium ebracteolatum G. Chandler & Crisp
 Gastrolobium effusum (M.D. Crisp & F.H. Mollemans) G. Chandler & Crisp
 Gastrolobium linearifolium G. Chandler & Crisp
 Gastrolobium nervosum (Meisn.) G. Chandler & Crisp
 Gastrolobium retusum Lindl.
 Gastrolobium stipulare Meisn.
 Gastrolobium whicherensis G. Chandler & Crisp

Gastrolobium spinosum Group
 Gastrolobium aculeatum G. Chandler, Crisp & R.J. Bayer
 Gastrolobium euryphyllum G. Chandler & Crisp

 Gastrolobium spinosum Benth.—Prickly poison
 var. grandiflorum C.Gardner
 var. spinosum Benth.
 var. triangulare Benth.
 var. trilobum S. Moore
 Gastrolobium triangulare (Benth.) Domin
 Gastrolobium trilobum Benth.—Bullock poison
 Gastrolobium wonganensis G. Chandler & Crisp

Gastrolobium villosum Group
 Gastrolobium densifolium C.A.Gardner—Mallet poison
 Gastrolobium glabratum G. Chandler & Crisp
 Gastrolobium ovalifolium Henfr.—Runner poison
 Gastrolobium rotundifolium Meisn.—Gilbernine poison
 Gastrolobium tomentosum C.A.Gardner—Woolly poison
 Gastrolobium villosum Benth.—Crinkle-leaved poison

Incertae Sedis
 Gastrolobium axillare Meisn.
 Gastrolobium cyanophyllum G. Chandler & Crisp
 Gastrolobium dilatatum (Benth.) G. Chandler & Crisp
 Gastrolobium elegans G. Chandler & Crisp
 Gastrolobium ferrugineum G. Chandler, Crisp & R.J. Bayer
 Gastrolobium humile G. Chandler & Crisp
 Gastrolobium lehmannii Meisn.
 Gastrolobium nudum G. Chandler & Crisp
 Gastrolobium venulosum G. Chandler & Crisp

Species names with uncertain taxonomic status
The status of the following species is unresolved:

 Gastrolobium boormani Maiden & Betche
 Gastrolobium compactum C.A. Gardner
 Gastrolobium elachistum F.Muell.
 Gastrolobium henfreyi Lem.
 Gastrolobium huegelii Henfr.
 Gastrolobium makoyanum Heynh.
 Gastrolobium revolutum Crisp
 Gastrolobium scorsifolium F.Muell.
 Gastrolobium splendens Heynh.
 Gastrolobium velutinum Lindl. ex J. Paxton
 Gastrolobium verticillatum Heynh.
 Gastrolobium whicherense G.Chandler & Crisp
 Gastrolobium wonganense G.Chandler & Crisp

See also
 Western Shield Conservation Practices

Notes

References

Further reading

External links
 
 FloraBase the Western Australia Flora: Gastrolobium 
 Gastrolobium

 
Mirbelioids
Fabaceae genera
Taxa named by Robert Brown (botanist, born 1773)